Helmut Lang may refer to:

 Helmut Lang (artist) (born 1956), Austrian-born fashion designer and artist
 Helmut Lang (athlete) (born 1940), Austrian Olympic sprinter
 Helmut Lang (fashion brand), brand created by Helmut Lang in 1986